Ìjùmú is a Local Government Area in Kogi State, Nigeria. Its headquarters are in the town of Iyara. Other towns in the local government include Ayetoro Gbede, Iyah-Gbede, Ayegunle Gbede, Araromi Gbede, Ayere, Ayeh Gbede, Okoro Gbede, Odokoro Gbede, Ekinrin adde, Egbeda egga, Iyamoye, Ogidi, Ikoyi, Otungba, Oton-Ade, Origa, etc. The people of Ìjùmú speak okun dialect of Yoruba language. The major occupation is farming by the men while the women engage in trade. Education is the major industry in Ìjùmú.

It has an area of 1,306 km2 and a population of 119,929 at the 2006 census.

The postal code of the area is 261.

The current chairman of the local government is Hon. Taufiq Isa. The current National President of the Ijumu Development Union (IDU) is Mr Kayode Olorunmaiye. He was elected during the IDU Annual Congress at Iyara in December 2020 for a term of two years, taking over from the previous National President, Mr Taiye Atibioke

Languages
Ìjùmú is highly linguistically diverse. Some of the local Volta–Niger languages spoken in Ijumu LGA are:
Ukaan language
Akpes language (Abesabesi)
Ahan language
Ayere language
Akoko language (Arigidi)

Notable people

 
 
 Smart Adeyemi, a Senator representing Kogi West, and a past National President of the Nigerian Union of Journalists from 1999 to 2006.
 S. A. Ajayi, a Nigerian statesman, pioneer politician in old Kabba Province and the founding father of Ijumu Local Government.
 Shola Ameobi, an Ayetoro Gbede born English footballer, playing for Newcastle United as a striker.
 David Jemibewon, a retired Nigerian Army Major-General who served as military governor of the defunct Western State (Aug 1975 – March 1976), as governor of Oyo State after it was created from part of the old Western State (March 1976 -July 1978), and later as Minister of Police Affairs (1999 to 2000). 
 Samuel Jemigbon (4 March 1934 – 17 June 2009), was a Christian clergyman who was Chairman of the Lagos, Western/Northern Area Territory and Vice-President of The Apostolic Church Nigeria.
 Dino Melaye, a former Senator of Kogi West District in the National Assembly.
 Nike Davies-Okundaye, also known as Nike Okundaye, Nike Twins Seven Seven and Nike Olaniyi, is a batik and Adire textile designer.
 Bayo Ojo, a former Attorney General of the Federal Republic of Nigeria.
 Folashade Yemi-Esan, a Nigerian civil servant and current head of the civil service of the federation since 28 February 2020.

References

Local Government Areas in Kogi State
Local Government Areas in Yorubaland